The Annunciation is a painting by the Italian Renaissance painter Filippo Lippi. Dating to 1440–1445, it is housed in the Galleria Nazionale d'Arte Antica of Palazzo Barberini, Rome.

The composition pivots around the Virgin, who occupies the centre of the scene. In the background, on the right, two small figures of women are riding a stair. The two donor portraits show the unknown donors kneeling behind a cordonata.   That they were represented in natural size (i.e., in the same size as the religious figures) was a relatively new stylistic feature.

See also
Lippi's Annunciation (Galleria Doria Pamphilj, Rome)
Lippi's Annunciation (Munich)

1440 paintings
1441 paintings
1442 paintings
1443 paintings
1444 paintings
1445 paintings
Paintings by Filippo Lippi
Lippi
Collections of the Galleria Nazionale d'Arte Antica
Depictions of kneeling
Books in art